Crawford is a city in Oglethorpe County, Georgia, United States. The population was 832 at the 2010 census.

History
Crawford was originally called "Lexington Depot", and under the latter name had its start when the railroad was extended to that point. The Georgia General Assembly incorporated the place as the "Town of Crawford" in 1876. The present name is after William H. Crawford (1772–1834), U.S. Secretary of War and Secretary of the Treasury.

Geography

Crawford is located at  (33.883289, -83.155413). U.S. Route 78 passes through the city, leading southeast  to Lexington, the Oglethorpe County seat, and northwest  to Athens.

Demographics

As of the census of 2000, there were 807 people, 326 households, and 203 families residing in the city. The racial makeup of the city was 68.77% White, 29.49% African American, 0.12% Native American, 0.37% Asian, and 1.24% from two or more races. Hispanic or Latino of any race were 1.24% of the population.

There were 326 households, out of which 28.8% had children under the age of 18 living with them, 38.7% were married couples living together, 19.3% had a female householder with no husband present, and 37.7% were non-families. 33.7% of all households were made up of individuals, and 17.2% had someone living alone who was 65 years of age or older.  The average household size was 2.29 and the average family size was 2.93.

In the city, the population was spread out, with 23.0% under the age of 18, 8.7% from 18 to 24, 24.4% from 25 to 44, 20.0% from 45 to 64, and 23.9% who were 65 years of age or older.  The median age was 40 years. For every 100 females, there were 71.3 males.  For every 100 females age 18 and over, there were 67.4 males.

The median income for a household in the city was $19,917, and the median income for a family was $32,969. Males had a median income of $27,500 versus $19,028 for females. The per capita income for the city was $13,934.  About 15.5% of families and 23.7% of the population were below the poverty line, including 19.6% of those under age 18 and 26.4% of those age 65 or over.

Infrastructure

Transportation
Crawford is bisected east to west by U.S. Route 78. North Avenue is the primary northbound thoroughfare. The only traffic light in Oglethorpe County is at the intersection of U.S. 78 and North Avenue. Maxeys Road is the primary southbound thoroughfare. Smokey Road and Park Avenue are also primary residential streets leading out of town. Church Street and Elm Street are divided one-way streets in the heart of town that create the town plaza, where many local cultural and commercial activities are held. The nearest airport is Athens Ben-Epps Airport. Passenger rail in Crawford was maintained by the Georgia Railroad until 1984. Intercity bus service provided by Greyhound Lines runs a route through Crawford, though the loading point is in nearby Athens.

Utilities
Electricity is provided directly by Georgia Power. Water and sewage are provided by the city. The city maintains two treatment plants: one is located off U.S. 78 near the western city limit, while the second is located off Waterworks Road at the end of Park Avenue on the eastern city limit. The city also provides water services to some parts of Oglethorpe County as well as the county school system.

References

Cities in Georgia (U.S. state)
Cities in Oglethorpe County, Georgia
Athens – Clarke County metropolitan area